Al-Qisa (also spelled Qaysa) is a town in southern Syria, administratively part of the Rif Dimashq Governorate, located southeast of Damascus. Nearby localities include Harran al-Awamid to the south, Otaybah to the east, al-Abadah to the northeast, al-Jarba to the north, al-Qasimiyah to the northwest, al-Bilaliyah and Deir Salman to the west and al-Ahmadiyah to the southwest. According to the Syria Central Bureau of Statistics (CBS), al-Qisa had a population of 4,151 in the 2004 census.

References

Populated places in Douma District